Crowell House is a historic home located at Sea Cliff in Nassau County, New York.  It was built in 1871 and is a -story, rectangular building with 12-inch poured concrete walls and a mansard roof in the Second Empire style.  It features a -story square tower with a tent roof.

It was listed on the National Register of Historic Places in 1988.

References

Houses on the National Register of Historic Places in New York (state)
Second Empire architecture in New York (state)
Houses completed in 1871
Houses in Nassau County, New York
National Register of Historic Places in Oyster Bay (town), New York